Birte Tove (née Birte Tove Sørensen; 1945–2016), was a Danish actress and nude model. She is best known for her work in the 1970s Bedside-films, an erotic film series produced by A/S Palladium. Her films were popular internationally, and in Hong Kong she was nicknamed, "the Danish Elizabeth Taylor".

Alongside her modeling and acting career, Tove trained as a nurse, and she worked for several years in home care.

Biography 
Birte Tove was born on 16 January 1945 in Helsingør, Denmark. She had been married Ole Brix Schächter from October 1970 until 1995, which ended in divorce.

In 1967, she first appeared as a model in Ekstra Bladet, a Danish tabloid newspaper. In 1969, Tove had her first acting role in the American–Danish film "Swedish Fly Girls" (1971), where she played a free-spirited flight attendant looking for love. Throughout the 1970s, she starred in many Bedside-films, often alongside actor Ole Søltoft. She lived in Hong Kong from 1972 until 1975, where she worked with the Shaw Brothers Studio and filmed Sexy Girls of Denmark (1973), Bamboo House of Dolls (1973), and The Mini Skirt Gang (1975). 

Tove died on 6 February 2016 from multiple sclerosis.

Filmography

Film

Television

See also 
 List of Danish films of the 1970s

References

External links 
 

1945 births
2016 deaths
Danish female adult models
20th-century Danish actresses
People from Helsingør
Deaths from multiple sclerosis